Montemagno (Montmagn in Piedmontese) is a comune (municipality) in the Province of Asti in the Italian region Piedmont, located about  east of Turin and about  northeast of Asti.

The municipality of Montemagno contains the frazioni (subdivisions, mainly villages and hamlets) Santo Stefano and San Carlo.

Montemagno borders the following municipalities: Altavilla Monferrato (AL), Casorzo, Castagnole Monferrato, Grana, Refrancore, and Viarigi.

Founded around the year 1000, Montemagno is a hamlet consisting of twelve alleys labeled by Roman numerals connoting its identity, and is included in the "Castelli Aperti" circuit in southern Piedmont.

Attractions and landmarks
The Casa sul portone, the last remaining gate of the defensive wall, and the Baroque Cumiana-stone staircase are historically valuable.

The chiesa di San Vittore, the Romanesque church dedicated to Saint Victor, with a high bell tower at its side, is appreciable from an architectural standpoint.

The chiesa campestre di Santa Maria di Vallinò, the small country church dedicated to Vallinò's Madonna, where the local population makes frequent pilgrimages to, is immersed in the countryside. In the last years the small church has been a picnicking place for tourists, thanks to its privileged location at the center of a valley among the hills of the village.

On La Stampa daily newspaper, the square of the chiesa parrocchiale dei Santi Martino e Stefano was mentioned as one of the most beautiful squares in Piedmont, because the staircase and the church dominating it are very similar to the ones at Piazza di Spagna in Rome.

Demographic evolution

Notable people
 Bice Mortara Garavelli, linguist
 Umberto Lombardo, football player
 Luigi Giuseppe Lasagna, second Salesian bishop, missionary in Brazil
 Luigi Bianco, archbishop, Apostolic nuncio in Honduras

References

External links
  Institutional website
  Montemagno by MonferratoArte, a website containing a wide historical-bibliographical repertoire of the artists working at the suburban churches in the Diocese of Casale Monferrato
  Portfolio fotografico [Photographic Portfolio] (archived), from the municipality of Montemagno's old website